Haiti, for much of its history and up to the present day, has been prevailingly a Christian country, primarily Roman Catholic, although in some instances it is profoundly modified and influenced through syncretism. A common syncretic religion is Vodou, which combined the Yoruba religion of enslaved Africans with Catholicism and some Native American strands; it shows similarities, and shares many deity-saints, with Cuban Santería and Brazilian Candomblé. The constitution of Haiti establishes the freedom of religion and does not establish a state religion, although the Catholic Church receives some preferential treatment.

The Catholic Religion makes up the largest Christian group in the country, they are estimated to be about 55 percent of the population according to the 2018 CIA World Factbook, and 57 percent according to the Pew Research Center. The historical background is very much due to the French influence brought about through the newly conquered territories.

Protestantism has grown in recent years and Protestants are currently estimated by the CIA World Factbook to form 28.5% of the population, while the Pew Research Center estimates their share to be nearly 30 percent.

Christianity

Catholicism

The predominant denomination is Roman Catholicism. Similar to the rest of Latin America, Saint-Domingue was built up by Roman Catholic European powers such as the Spanish and the French. Following in this legacy, Catholicism was in the Haitian constitution as its official state religion until 1987. According to recent estimates by the CIA World Factbook and Pew Research Center, between 55 and 60% of Haitians are Catholics. Pope John Paul II visited Haiti in 1983. In a speech in the capital of Port-au-Prince, he criticized the government of Jean-Claude Duvalier. It is believed that the impact of this speech on the Catholic bureaucracy in Haiti contributed to his removal in 1986.

According to the Catholic Church in Haiti, the 10 dioceses of the two ecclesiastical provinces of Haiti include 251 parishes and about 1,500 Christian rural communities. The local clergy has 400 diocesan priests and 300 seminarians. There are also 1,300 religious missionary priests belonging to more than 70 religious order and fraternities. Vocations to the priesthood are plentiful.

Protestantism

The CIA Factbook reports that around 29.5% of the population is Protestant (Pentecostal 17.4%, Baptist 6.9%, Adventist 4%, Methodist 0.5% other 0.7%). Other sources put the Protestant population higher than this, suggesting that it may form one-third of the population today, as Protestant churches have experienced significant growth in recent decades. Other sources put the Protestant population higher than this, suggesting that it might have formed from one-third of the population in 2001.

The Episcopal Diocese of Haiti is the Anglican Communion diocese consisting of the entire territory of Haiti. It is part of Province 2 of the Episcopal Church (United States). Its cathedral, Holy Trinity (French: Cathédrale Sainte Trinité) located in the corner of Avenue Mgr. Guilloux and Rue Pavée in downtown Port-au-Prince, has been destroyed six times, including in the 2010 Haiti earthquake. It is the largest diocese in the Episcopal Church (United States), with 83,698 members reported in 2008.

Protestant missionaries have been active in Haiti since the early 19th century, with Evangelical missions increasing by the 1970s to convert large numbers of Haitians. Unlike mainline Protestants, who perceive of the belief in non-Christian spirits as superstitions, Evangelical Protestants recast Haitian Vodou spirits as demons against whom Christ would fight.

The Church of Jesus Christ of Latter-day Saints
 
Missionary work in Haiti by the Church of Jesus Christ of Latter-day Saints began in May 1980 and the land was dedicated for the preaching of the gospel by Thomas S. Monson, then a member of the church's Quorum of the Twelve Apostles, on 17 April 1983.  As of 2021, the church reported having 48 congregations and more than 24,000 members in Haiti. In September 2012, the third and fourth Haitian stakes were created.  All four of those stakes are based in the capital region.  A fifth, based in Petit-Goâve, was formed in September 2018. districts are based in Les Cayes, Saint-Marc, Gonaïves, and Cap-Haïtien.
  
At the church's April 2009 General Conference, Fouchard Pierre-Nau, a native of Jérémie, was called as an area seventy in the church's Fourth Quorum of the Seventy, the most prominent church position ever held by a Haitian.  In April 2016, Pierre-Nau was released and Hubermann Bien-Aimé, a native of Gonaïves, was called to that same quorum.

During the April 2015 General Conference, Monson—then serving as the church's president—announced the church's intention to build a temple in Port-au-Prince. Groundbreaking took place 28 October 2017.  In anticipation of the temple's completion, Fritzner and Gina Joseph were called in August 2018 as the first president and matron of the temple.

Vodou

The New World Afro-diasporic religion of Vodou is also practised. Vodou encompasses several different traditions, and consists of a mix encompassing African, European and indigenous Taíno religious elements. In this way, it is very similar to other Latin American syncretist movements, such as the Cuban Santería. It is more widespread in rural parts of the country, partly due to negative stigmas attached to its practice. During the season of Lent, Vodou societies create parading musical bands for a festival called Rara, and fulfill religious obligations in local spaces such as streams, rivers, and trees. 

The CIA World Factbook reports that 2.1% of the population identifies its religion as Vodou, but adds that "many Haitians practice elements of Vodou in addition to another religion, most often Roman Catholicism". The proportion of Haitians that practice Vodou is disputed, due to the often syncretic manner in which it is practiced alongside Catholicism, in spite of the Church's strong condemnation of it. Haitian Protestants are presumably less likely to practice Vodou, as their churches strongly denounce it as diabolical.

Islam

As of 2010, there is a small Islamic community in Haiti of around 4000–5000 Muslims, who mainly reside in Port-au-Prince, Cap-Haïtien and its surrounding suburbs. The history of Islam on the island of Hispaniola begins with slavery in Haiti. Many Muslims were imported as slaves to Haiti.

In 2000, Nawoon Marcellus, a member of Fanmi Lavalas from Saint-Raphaël, became the first Muslim elected to the Chamber of Deputies of Haiti.

Baháʼí Faith

The Baháʼí Faith in Haiti begins with a mention by `Abdu'l-Bahá, then head of the religion, in 1916 as one of the island countries of the Caribbean being among the places Baháʼís should take the religion to. The first Baháʼí to visit Haiti was Leonora Armstrong in 1927. After that others visited until Louis George Gregory visited in January 1937 and he mentions a small community of Baháʼís operating in Haiti. The first long term pioneers, Ruth and Ellsworth Blackwell, arrived in 1940. Following their arrival the first Baháʼí Local Spiritual Assembly of Haiti was formed in 1942 in Port-au-Prince. From 1951 the Haitian Baháʼís participated in regional organizations of the religion until 1961 when Haitian Baháʼís elected their own National Spiritual Assembly and soon took on goals reaching out into neighboring islands. The Association of Religion Data Archives (relying mostly on the World Christian Encyclopedia) estimated some 21,000 Baháʼís in Haiti in 2005 and about the same in 2010.

Judaism

Sephardic Jews arrived in Saint-Domingue during the first days of the colonial period, despite that they were banned in the official Catholic edicts. They became merchants and integrated themselves into the French Catholic society. Waves of Jews continued to immigrate to the Haiti, including a group of Ashkenazi Jews escaping Hitler's Germany in the 1940s; Haiti was one of the few countries to welcome them openly. Haitian Catholics had idiosyncratic ideas about Jews, stemming from Catholic anti-Judaism, although many Vodou practitioners imagined themselves to be the descendants of Jews and to hold esoteric Judaic knowledge.

There is a group of Judaism predominantly residing in Port-au-Prince, where the community today meets at the home of businessman billionaire Gilbert Bigio, a Haitian of Syrian descent. Bigio's father first settled in Haiti in 1925 and was active in the Jewish community. In November 1947, his father played a significant role in Haiti's support for the statehood of Israel in a vote to the United Nations. Every Rosh Hashanah and Yom Kippur, services are held at his residence. The last Jewish wedding to take place in Haiti occurred 10 years ago; Bigio's daughter, while the last bris was done for his son, more than 30 years ago. Bigio owns the only Torah in all of the country, which he provides to the community for services.

Religious freedom
The constitution of Haiti establishes the freedom of religion. The Ministry of Foreign Affairs oversees and monitors religious groups and laws affecting them. While Catholicism has not been the state religion since 1987, a 19th-century concordat with the Holy See continues to confer preferential treatment to the Catholic Church, in the form of stipends for clergy and financial support to churches and religious schools. The Catholic Church also retains the right to appoint certain amounts of clergy in Haiti without the government's consent.

Religious groups are not required to register with the government, but may do so in order to receive special standing in legal proceedings, tax exemptions, and civil recognition for marriage and baptismal certificates. The government has continually failed to recognize marriages performed by Haitian Vodou practitioners, despite it being a registered religion. Government officials claim that they are working with the Vodou community to establish a certification process for their clergy in order to resolve this issue. Additionally, the Ministry of Foreign Affairs has continually not approved a request from the Muslim community to register as a religious group, which has been outstanding since the 1980s. According to the government, this was due to not having received necessary financial documentation as part of the registration process.

According to the government, Muslims in jail do not reliably have access to halal food and Muslim clergy due to a lack of resources.

Protestant and Catholic clergy have reported good relations with the government. Representatives of the Vodou and Muslim communities have reported social stigma against their communities, and discrimination in employment.

See also
Roman Catholicism in Haiti
Protestantism in Haiti
Judaism in Haiti

References

 
Religious demographics